The Kelston toll road was a  private, temporary toll road, built by a private entrepreneur without planning permission between Bath and Kelston,  southeast of Bristol in Bath and North East Somerset, England.  It opened on 1 August and closed on 17 November 2014, when the A431 road reopened.

Context
The road ran to the north of and parallel to Kelston Road, a part of the A431 road that was closed on 17 February 2014 due to a landslip. As it was anticipated that the A431 would stay closed until the end of 2014, on 1 August 2014 the Kelston toll road opened for vehicles up to 3.5 tonnes and a toll fee of £2 per car and £1 per motorcycle. The entrepreneur was 62-year-old Mike Watts who followed a suggestion made by his wife. The toll station was without boom barriers. By early October 2014, the road had been used by 100,000 vehicles. The cost of the toll road was £150,000, with a further £150,000 for the toll station, maintenance and other expenses.

Operation
In September 2014, Watts applied to Bath and North East Somerset Council for retroactive planning permission. Although a decision had been expected on 3 October, it was delayed until the end of the month. Permission was eventually withheld, and it was reported that Watts could be facing losses because the A431 was to be reopened earlier than originally expected.  The council issued Watts with a demand for £3,000 in business rates.

The road closed on 17 November 2014, when the A431 reopened.  Watts said: "We have lost out – a rough estimate is probably about £10,000 to £15,000 adrift. But I'm not complaining."  He said that the toll road would now be dug up, and that  "within six months nobody would know the Kelston toll road had ever existed". As the toll road company had insufficient funds for the reinstatement works, the original builders of the road offered to do this at no charge.  HM Revenue and Customs also agreed to waive the shortfall in VAT due.

It was reported that construction of the toll road was likely to have caused damage to archaeological remains of medieval strip lynchets: as a result archaeological investigations will need to be carried out during the reinstatement of the land in order to understand what was there and the damage caused.

The council had to spend a further £660,000 to finish the A431 repairs, required to provide deeper pilings found necessary as the works progressed, taking repair costs to about £2 million.

References

External links 

 
 
 
 

Toll roads in the United Kingdom
Roads in Somerset
Bath and North East Somerset